Ralph Hill (1908–1994) was an American runner.

Ralph Hill may also refer to:

 Ralph Hill (representative) (1827–1899), United States Representative from Indiana
 Ralph Hill (American football) (born 1949), NFL football player
 Ralph Hill (music critic) (1900–1950), British music critic
 Ralph Nading Hill (1917–1987), Vermont writer and preservationist

See also
 Ralph Hills (1902–1977), American shot putter